Captain Midnight is a U.S. adventure franchise that began with a radio show.

Captain Midnight may also refer to:

 Captain Midnight (serial), a 1942 film serial
 On the Air Live with Captain Midnight, a 1979 movie with a character who used "Captain Midnight" as an alias
 John R. MacDougall (born 1961), electronic engineer who in 1986 jammed HBO's satellite signal in protest
 Steve Somers (born 1947), WFAN radio host known as "Captain Midnight"

 "Captain Midnight", a song from Robin Trower's 1983 album Back It Up 
 "Capt. Midnight", a song from Tomahawk's 2003 album Mit Gas